The city of Puerto Vallarta, in the Mexican state of Jalisco, is a popular destination for LGBT tourists. CNN has described Puerto Vallarta as Mexico's "top LGBT destination", with "one of the best week-long Pride festivals in the world". Similar, The Independent has called the city "the gay capital of Mexico, with a whole district of hotels and restaurants catering to the LGBT+ community". Puerto Vallarta's LGBT culture is based in Zona Romántica, which features the gay-friendly Playa de los Muertos.

LGBT tourism 
In 2016, The New York Times Ondine Cohane said, "with a plethora of gay bars and clubs (and a four-year-old Gay Pride event), the city has the deserved reputation for being one of the most L.G.B.T.-friendly destinations south of the border". In 2023, Lola Mendez of The Times wrote, "a fifth of all visitors ... are members of the LGBT community, according to official tourism figures. Gay travellers have been visiting Puerto Vallarta since the 1960s and have dubbed Zona Romantica, where Vallarta Pride is held, the 'gayborhood'."

In 2014, Jennifer Polland included the city and nearby Punta Mita in Business Insider 2014 list of the 12 "best honeymoon destinations for gay couples", and Gareth Rubin included Puerto Vallarta in CNN's list of "great locations for a same-sex honeymoon". The Yucatán Times called the city "super-gay" in 2019. Puerto Vallarta has been selected as a favorite LGBTQ travel and honeymoon destination by readers of OutSmart.

Zona Romántica 

Puerto Vallarta's LGBT culture is based in Zona Romántica, which offers a gay beach experience and businesses catering to the LGBT community. John Gottberg Anderson of The Bulletin has said "a lot of the romance in [Zona Romantica] is of the gay and lesbian variety, as this subculture is widely accepted here". According to the Bay Area Reporter, "The gay village ... is centered around the intersection of Lazaro Cardenas and Ignacio L. Vallarta." The southern end of the neighborhood's Playa de los Muertos is considered gay-friendly and is popular with LGBT travelers. SFGate has said "the most popular beach for gays is the area south of the pier and just north of" the sculpture The Boy on the Seahorse.

Businesses and organizations 

The city and especially Zona Romántica has many businesses which cater to the LGBT community. Mantamar Beach Club Bar & Sushi and Ritmos Beach Cafe are beach clubs along Playa de los Muertos.

Performance venues include Palm Cabaret and Bar and Act II (also known as Act2PV), which has hosted drag shows by Mama Tits and other drag queens, a program dedicated to Whitney Houston, and a production of The Rocky Horror Picture Show. 

Boat excursions have included the lesbian-operated Diana's Tours as well as the more "sexually-charged" tour by Wet and Wild Cruise. Jet's and Wet and Wild offer "coastal tours that conclude with a secluded, clothing-optional beach party", according to Out magazine.

Nightlife 

In 2020, Jim Malcolm of the Washington Blade said Zona Romántica had 32 "LGBT bars that are quite varied". Notable gay bars and LGBT-friendly nightclubs include CC Slaughters, Garbo, La Noche, Mr. Flamingo, and Paco's Ranch (also known as Club Paco Paco). Others include Apaches, Bar Frida, Blondie's, Code (or CO-DE), Divas, Industry, Kooky Karaoke, La Cantina Margarita, the craft cocktail lounge One Six One, and Reinas. Out described Code as "more of an LGBTQ-inclusive space with a Vegas vibe; spheres drop from the ceiling and change color while flames shoot from the DJ booth." According to the magazine, Industry "plays pop favorites in its main bar. During circuit season, the back room pounds with house music and often requires a cover."

Gay-friendly male strip clubs include 69, Anthropology, and Wet Dreams (or simply Wet). According to Out, 69 "offers a more upscale experience, with expert pole dancers performing amazing feats for the crowd", and Wet Dreams "is probably the most well-known, although it looks seedy and the men can be aggressive here in pulling customers into back rooms." Spartacus is a gay bathhouse.

Elixir Mixology has been described as "a lesbian-owned bar and safe space for queer women". Out described Qulture as "a courtyard bar with art galleries featuring LGBTQ+ artists".

Hotels and resorts 

Puerto Vallarta offers many LGBT-friendly accommodations ranging from bed and breakfasts and guesthouses to hotels, lodges and resorts. According to Keith Langstone of Lonely Planet, "All the big brand resorts are LGBTIQ-inclusive, and there are even LGBTIQ-exclusive hotels."

In addition to Blue Chairs Resort by the Sea, LGBT hotels and resorts have included Almar, Casa Cupula, Hotel Mercurio, and Pinata PV. Ross Matthews got married at the Almar in 2022. Casa Cupula hosts Naked Pool Party weekly. Marriott Puerto Vallarta Resort & Spa has been described as a gay- and lesbian-friendly hotel.

Health care 

Solidaridad Ed Thomas AC (SETAC) is a local organization and community center focused on LGBT healthcare. SETAC has a program for pre-exposure prophylaxis (PrEP), as of 2018. In 2022, SETAC took the initiative to illuminate Los Arcos and Presidencia Municipal with red lights to commemorate World AIDS Day.

Vallarta Gay Clinic, a private clinic specializing in LGBT healthcare, opened in Zona Romántica in 2023.

Events 

The city has hosted events as part of World AIDS Day for three decades, as of 2022. In addition to a walk, activities have included conferences and workshops seeking to increase awareness of HIV/AIDS prevention.

White Party events are held on many holiday weekends, especially for New Year's Eve. In 2021, a White Party held on New Year's Eve during the COVID-19 pandemic was criticized by some members of the LGBT community for disregarding health regulations. The event BeefDip Bear Week caters to the bear community.

Puerto Vallarta will be a "tourist venue" when Guadalajara hosts the Gay Games in 2023.

Vallarta Pride 
Puerto Vallarta has an annual Pride celebration. In 2014, SFGate said the event "has expanded from a three-day weekend to five days of beach parties, music festivals, fashion shows, assorted activities and a mass commitment ceremony this year." According to National Geographic, the event is held in mid to late May and sees activities throughout the city, including along beaches. The magazine said in 2019: "The parade brings nearly all residents out to see the marchers and colorful floats pass along the picturesque Malecón and ends with a festive block party. Its over-the-top Drag Derby, a combination drag pageant and obstacle course race, is not to be missed."

Approximately 17,000 people attended in 2017. The 2019 event featured a swim suit fashion show. Lola Mendez ranked Puerto Vallarta number one in The Times' list of "best places around the world to celebrate Pride in 2023".

Safety 
Puerto Vallarta has been recognized as one of the safest travel destinations for the LGBT community. Despite this, the city has seen some instances of violence against LGBT people. In 2018, a gunman attacked a gay couple who were holding hands near Lázaro Cárdenas Park, injuring one. One of the victims "alleged that the incident was motivated by the couple's sexuality" and "expressed concern that police were covering up what really happened in order to avoid damaging the tourism sector". The LGBT Business and Tourism Association of Puerto Vallarta and the Puerto Vallarta Tourism Board issued a joint statement condemning the attack, expressing sympathies for the couple, and saying visitors "are part of the LGBTQ community and safely enjoy the destination, again without any incident".

According to Vallarta Daily News, local police were collaborating with the LGBTTTI Vallarta Collective on sensitivity training in 2018. In 2022, the city's police commissioner announced the creation of Mexico's first Gay Police Unit. In 2023, the U.S. Department of State discouraged citizens from traveling to Jalisco "over increased crime and kidnappings in the region".

Art 
In 2022, the city's Building Commission announced plans to paint rainbow crossings at intersections in the Amapas and Zona Romántica neighborhoods. Artist Octavio González is working on Puerto Vallarta's first sculpture dedicated to the LGBT community, as of 2023.

References

Further reading

External links 
 

LGBT culture in Mexico
Puerto Vallarta